Konjushka’s Lake is the highest lake in the Šar Mountains, which straddle the border between Kosovo and North Macedonia. The lake is approximately 100 m long, 70 m wide, and 1 m deep. It lies at the foot of Mount Konjuška. A hunting lodge was built in the 1970s to accommodate those hunting wild goats.

The name comes from the Albanian for “close to the summit”. Yugoslavian maps used the Serbian language name, Gornje Jezero. The Serbian name comes from its being the highest lake in the mountain range, and like Gornja Mahalla near what is now Gornje Selo near Prizren, the area was once used for pasture by local Serbs.

References

External links
 Kosovo Guide page
 Sharr Guide page

Lakes of Kosovo